Neus Ballús (born 1980) is a Catalan film director and scriptwriter.

She has a degree in Audiovisual Communication and a Master in Documentary Making from the Pompeu Fabra University. She released her first film La plaga (The Plague) in 2013, which was screened at the 63rd Berlin International Film Festival. It won 4 Gaudí Awards and was nominated for the LUX Prize, the European Film Awards and the Goya Awards. The film portrays everyday life in a rural zone of the periphery of Barcelona, named Gallecs. Before, she had done some shorts like La Gabi (2004), L'avi de la càmera (Grandad with Camera, 2005) and the documentary Immersió (2009), awarded with the Best Short Film Prize at the ALCINE Festival.

Her second film, El viatge de Marta (Staff Only) (2019), also premiered at the 69th Berlin International Film Festival and was screened in cinemas in France and Spain. It is about a 17-year-old girl who spends her Christmas holidays in Senegal with her brother and father. Tired of family planned trips, and of her father's behaviour, she opens the door to the staff area and discovers a world that allows her to develop close and complex relationships.

In August 2021, her film Sis dies corrents (The Odd-job men) (Distinto Films, 2021), premiered at the 74th Locarno Film Festival, telling the story of a young Moroccan plumber who has to deal with equally eccentric colleagues and customers in order to get through his one-week probationary contract.

Works 
 Immersió - 2009
 The Plague (La plaga) - 2013
 Staff Only (El viatge de la Marta) - 2019
 The Odd-Job Men (Sis dies corrents) - 2021

References 

Film directors from Catalonia
Spanish women screenwriters
21st-century Spanish screenwriters
Pompeu Fabra University alumni
1980 births
Living people
People from Vallès Occidental